David Emmons Johnston (April 10, 1845 – July 7, 1917) was an American lawyer and Democratic politician from West Virginia who served as a member of the United States House of Representatives from 1899 to 1901.

Early life 
Johnston was born near Pearisburg, Virginia, in 1845.

Career 
In April 1861, he enlisted in the Confederate Army and served four years in the 7th Virginia Infantry Regiment, Kemper's brigade of Pickett’s division. He studied law and was admitted to the bar in Giles County in 1867. He began practicing in Pearisburg, Virginia. He moved to Mercer County, West Virginia, in 1870.

Johnston served as prosecuting attorney from 1872 to 1876. He served as a member of the West Virginia Senate in 1878 but soon resigned. From 1880 to 1888, he was a judge on the Ninth Judicial Circuit Court. He was elected as a Democrat to the Fifty-sixth Congress (March 4, 1899 – March 3, 1901). His candidacy in 1900 for re-election was unsuccessful.

He moved to Portland, Oregon, in 1908 and resumed the practice of law.

Personal life 
He died in Portland on July 7, 1917, and was buried in Mount Scott Park Cemetery, which is now Lincoln Memorial Park Cemetery.

See also

United States congressional delegations from West Virginia

Sources
 September 2007.

External links
The Story of a Confederate Boy in the Civil War. Portland, Or.: Glass & Prudhomme Co., c1914.
 

1845 births
1917 deaths
Confederate States Army soldiers
County prosecuting attorneys in West Virginia
Lawyers from Portland, Oregon
People from Pearisburg, Virginia
People from Mercer County, West Virginia
People of Virginia in the American Civil War
Virginia lawyers
West Virginia circuit court judges
West Virginia lawyers
Democratic Party West Virginia state senators
Democratic Party members of the United States House of Representatives from West Virginia
19th-century American politicians
19th-century American judges
19th-century American lawyers